Colegio Alemán Alexander von Humboldt, A. C. is a network of German-language primary and secondary schools based in Greater Mexico City.

There are three campuses under a single school board, with each campus acting autonomously. As of 2010, the institution together is the largest German school outside of Germany.

History

The school was established in 1894, situated on Canoa Street in Mexico City. By 1900, the number of students was approaching 300, including students from outside the German community.

The school included German, Mexican, and other teachers and was modeled after other German schools abroad. There were multiple divisions, and Division A had facilities tailored for female students.

In 1940, a campus in Tacubaya was opened, and by 1968 the Civil Association "Alexander von Humboldt" is created, named after the German naturalist and explorer. The institution had incorporated itself into the Mexican Educational System, so students could obtain either Mexican or German certificates. By 1970, two additional campuses were opened and over 1000 students attended the school.

The association currently has 3 main campuses, and additionally a Kindergarten, and an Elementary School. The unaffiliated Club Alemán de México is used as a cultural and athletic facility by the German community.

In 2014 there was controversy over bullying in the Lomas Verdes campus.

Language of classes
Most subjects are taught in German, and children are required to be bi-lingual, unless they are starting Kindergarten.

Campuses

The following campuses are in Greater Mexico City:
 Campus Poniente/Campus West (formerly Campus La Herradura): Kindergarten, Elementary, Middle, and High School (or "Abitur" by German standards).
 There are two campuses. One, covering kindergarten, primary, secondary, and preparatory levels, is located in Huixquilucan, State of Mexico. The other, the Plantel Lomas Kindergarten Prado Norte, is located in Lomas de Chapultepec, Miguel Hidalgo, Mexico City.
 Campus Sur/Campus Süd (formerly Campus Xochimilco): Xochimilco, Mexico City: Kindergarten, Elementary, Middle, and High School (or Abitur by German standards).
 Kindergarten and Primary are in Plantel Tepepan in Colonia Tepepan, and Secondary and Preparatory are in Plantel La Noria in Colonia Huichapan. There is also a Kindergarten in the Plantel Pedregal in Jardines del Pedregal, Álvaro Obregón.
 Campus Norte/Campus Nord (formerly Campus Lomas Verdes), Kindergarten, Elementary, Middle, and High School
 The kindergarten and primary grades and the secondary and preparatory grades are in two separate campuses in Naucalpan de Juárez, State of Mexico.

It previously had a campus at 43 Benjamin G. Hill in Hipódromo Condesa, Cuauhtémoc, in what is now a part of Universidad La Salle.

See also
 German immigration to Mexico

References

Further reading
 Wolburg, Allan. "Renuevan el estadio del Colegio Alemán." Diario Reforma, ISSN 1563-7697, 02/20/2013, p. 14
 García, Norma. "Afecta vialidad minada tránsito al Colegio Alemán." Diario Reforma, ISSN 1563-7697, 10/27/2011, p. 3. "La más grande de las oquedades mide un metro con 9 centímetros de diámetro, y 21 centímetros de profundidad; la segunda más grande mide 80 centímetros de diámetro y 13 de profundidad."
 Anonymous. "Unen talentos Sinfónica de Minería y Coro del Colegio Alemán." NOTIMEX, 06/21/2012. "[...] Álvarez Ierena, acompañada por el Coro del Colegio Alemán, que celebra su 55 aniversario, ofreció anoche un magno concierto cuyo programa incluyó obras de Johann[...]"

Materials from the school:
 Entries in the Archivo Histórico, Colegio Alejandro von Humboldt, Mexico City - Jahresbericht 1912 is in Box 2
 Colegio Alemán Alexander von Humboldt, 1894-1994: Festschrift/Memorias (1994, published by the school in Mexico City) - An interview with Veronica Kugel, "Los años cincuenta", by Blanca Huici, is on pages 21-26
 Wossidlo, Eckart. Mexiko, von außen und von innen : Blickpunkte eines Lehrers am Colegio Alemán Alexander von Humboldt. Colegio Alemán Alexander von Humboldt, 2004.

External links 
 

Humboldt, Colegio Aleman Alexander von
Humboldt, Colegio Aleman Alexander von
German international schools in Mexico
Humboldt, Colegio Aleman Alexander von
High schools in the State of Mexico
Private schools in Mexico
Álvaro Obregón, Mexico City
Educational institutions established in 1894
1894 establishments in Mexico